G Force was a roller coaster at Drayton Manor Resort, Tamworth, England. It was the only X-Car coaster in the UK and was opened by the band G4 in 2005. The ride was also the third X-Car coaster to be built in the world, the first being the prototype Sky Wheel at Skyline Park in Germany and the second being X Coaster at Magic Springs. Another unique aspect of the X-Car coaster is the inverted lift, known as the humpty-bump lift. Unlike a conventional inclined lift, the lift on is similar to a standard vertical loop. At the top of the lift, riders are suspended upside down and the train is released to traverse two more inversions, including an immelman loop and a bent Cuban eight. The ride was originally called Project X but changed to G Force before the coaster's opening. The coaster closed in October 2018 after extensive downtime during the 2018 season. The park stated the maintenance cost for the coaster was too expensive and therefore the decision was to close the ride. As of January 2020, the ride had  been removed and was in storage at the rear of the park. It is now in storage somewhere in the Netherlands.

Ride Experience

Incidents 
No incidents.

Feedback

Closure

None

References

External links
 Press release at RCDB

Roller coasters introduced in 2005
Roller coasters in the United Kingdom
Amusement rides that closed in 2018